Matthew Shoecraft House is a historic home located at Lacona in Oswego County, New York.  It was built about 1867 and is a two-story, five bay rectangular Italianate style clapboard residence with a shallow pitched hipped roof and a wide cornice with paired turned brackets.

It was listed on the National Register of Historic Places in 1988.

References

Houses on the National Register of Historic Places in New York (state)
Italianate architecture in New York (state)
Houses completed in 1867
Houses in Oswego County, New York
National Register of Historic Places in Oswego County, New York